Gamachis is one of the Districts in the Oromia Regional State of Ethiopia. It is part of the West Hararghe Zone. It was part of former Chiro. Today, the capital of the woreda is called Kuni. It is located 20 miles from Chiro.

The city is located on the top of a hill and its climate is 70% cold and cloudy.  Gemechis woreda has many small cities located 20–45 miles away from each other. Sogido, Sire, Metadhab, and Degaga are the major ones. Transportation for commuting is a major problem of the woreda.

Demographics 
The 2007 national census reported a total population for this woreda of 184,238, of whom 93,766 were men and 90,472 were women; 3,863 or 2.1% of its population were urban dwellers. The majority of the inhabitants said they were Muslim, with 90.1% of the population reporting they observed this belief, while 9.64% of the population practiced Ethiopian Orthodox Christianity.

Notes 

Districts of Oromia Region